Thomas Leslie (born 1967) is an American architect.

Leslie earned a Bachelor of Architectural Studies from the University of Illinois at Urbana–Champaign in 1989, followed by a Master of Architecture at Columbia University in 1992. He worked for Foster & Partners for seven years, and joined the Iowa State University faculty in 2000. Leslie was a 2004 awardee of Association of Collegiate Schools of Architecture's Creative Achievement Award. He was named to the Pickard Chilton Professorship in Architecture within the Iowa State University College of Design in 2011. In 2013, Leslie was awarded the Booth Family Rome Prize in Historic Preservation and Conservation. Leslie received the 2015 Educator Award from the Iowa chapter of the American Institute of Architects. The following year, Leslie was appointed to a Morrill Professorship at Iowa State University. In 2018, Leslie was elected a fellow of the American Institute of Architects.

Selected publications

 Alternate URL

References

21st-century American historians
Living people
21st-century American male writers
Fellows of the American Institute of Architects
1967 births
20th-century American architects
Iowa State University faculty
Princeton University alumni
University of Illinois Urbana-Champaign alumni
American architectural historians
Architects from Iowa